China has the largest number of skyscrapers in the world, surpassing that of the top eleven largest, the United States (870+), United Arab Emirates (310+), South Korea (270+), Japan (270+), Malaysia (260+), Australia (140+), Indonesia (130+), Canada (130+), Philippines (120+) and Thailand (120+) combined. As of mid 2022, China has more than 3,000 skyscrapers above , of which 100 are "supertall" ( and above). 45 of the 84 buildings (completed and architecturally topped out) with a minimum height of  worldwide are in China (including Hong Kong).

China is home to five of the world's ten tallest buildings. The previous two tallest buildings in mainland China have also been in Shanghai.

In October 2021, the Chinese government announced restrictions on the construction of supertall buildings. The country's Ministry of Housing and Urban-Rural Development (MOHURD) said the action is driven by concerns on "issues such as costs, energy consumption, safety, and environmental impact".

Tallest buildings
This list includes skyscrapers in the Hong Kong Special Administrative Region.

This list does not include nonbuilding structures, such as the  Canton Tower in Guangzhou, which despite being the second tallest structure in China, is actually an observation tower.

Of the 122 buildings in this list, 20 are in Shenzhen, 11 are in Guangzhou, 7 are in Hong Kong, 6 are in Shanghai and 2 are in Beijing.

Under construction

On hold

Proposed

Timeline of tallest buildings

The following is a list of buildings that in the past held, or currently holds the title of the tallest building in mainland China. This list includes high-rises and skyscrapers only. It excludes pre-modern buildings as Liaodi Pagoda. It excludes such buildings as TV or observation towers like the Oriental Pearl Tower or Canton Tower. This list excludes buildings from Hong Kong, Macau or Taiwan.

Cities with the most skyscrapers 

Number of skyscrapers completed each year 
The following table lists the number of buildings that are 150 meters and taller built within the last 15 years.

In recent years, China has been finishing more than 100 skyscrapers per year, with about 120 planned for 2017. More than 1000 skyscrapers were constructed just within the last 15 years.

The following table lists the number of buildings that are 200 meters and taller built since 2017.

See also
 List of cities with the most skyscrapers
 List of tallest buildings
 List of tallest buildings in China by city
 List of tallest buildings in Hong Kong
 List of tallest buildings in Macau
 List of tallest buildings in Taiwan
 List of tallest structures in China

Notes

References

External links 

 
China